Moonlight on the Range is a 1937 American Western film directed by Sam Newfield and written by Fred Myton. The film stars Fred Scott, Al St. John, Lois January, Dick Curtis, Frank LaRue and Jimmy Aubrey. The film was released on October 6, 1937, by Spectrum Pictures.

Plot
Jeff Peters and Tom Killer Dane are look-alike half brothers, Tom decides to kill one of Jeff's friends and then make a raid while impersonating Jeff which leads to Jeff's arrest.

Cast          
Fred Scott as Jeff Peters / Tom Killer Dane
Al St. John as Fuzzy Jones
Lois January as Wanda Brooks
Dick Curtis as Hank 
Frank LaRue as Jedd Brooks
Jimmy Aubrey as Tex 
Oscar Gahan as Deputy
George Morrell as John
Carl Mathews as Guard 
Wade Walker as Musician
William McCall as Dave Cassidy
Shorty Miller as Musician
Jack Evans as Henchman
Rudy Sooter as Musician

References

External links
 

1937 films
American Western (genre) films
1937 Western (genre) films
Films directed by Sam Newfield
American black-and-white films
1930s English-language films
1930s American films